Fry Glacier is a glacier draining the slopes at the northeast corner of the Convoy Range and flowing along the south end of the Kirkwood Range into Tripp Bay, Victoria Land, Antarctica. It was first charted by the British Antarctic Expedition, 1907–09, and named for A.M. Fry, a contributor to the expedition.

References

Glaciers of Victoria Land
Scott Coast